The Rugby Africa Cup is a two-year men's rugby union tournament involving the top 16 African nations based on their World Rugby rankings, it is organised by Rugby Africa. The tournament was first held in 2000. It was renamed the Rugby Africa Cup in November 2019, it was previously called the Africa Cup since 2006, the CAR Top 9 and CAR Top 10.

Due to South Africa being far stronger than any other African nation, South African teams have only competed five times, and won the competition three times. The winning South African teams on these occasions were the under 23 or amateur players (in 2005, 2006 and 2007).

History
The African Cup of Rugby Union took place for the first time in 2000, with five teams taking part in the event, Morocco, Tunisia, Namibia, Zimbabwe and the hosts South Africa, the winner of the competition.
In 2004, a second division called CAR Development Trophy and now named now African Development Trophy was formed, reserved for U19 national teams.
In 2006, the Africa Cup was coupled with the Rugby World Cup qualification, the winner qualified for the Rugby World Cup. In 2011, a Division 1A was created and in 2014, the division took place as a four-team championship.

The winner of the 2022 Africa Gold Cup will qualify for the 2023 Rugby World Cup and the runner-up will qualify for its final qualification tournament in November 2022.

Structure
The tournament was revamped in November 2019, this time the top 16 nations, based on their World Rugby rankings prior to the competition, will compete over a two-year period. According to their website Rugby Africa explained the tournament as follows:
The first stage consists of a qualifying round: the teams ranked 9th, 10th, 11th and 12th will oppose the teams ranked 13th, 14th, 15th and 16th, respectively, in a single match at home. The winner of each of these four matches will progress to the group phase. In this second stage, the 12 teams are divided into 4 pools; inside each pool the 3 teams play against each other in a home or away game. The winner of each group will progress to the final tournament of the RAC. The top four teams from Africa will meet in one venue for the final stage of the RAC, which will include two semi-finals, a play-off for third place and, ultimately, the final to decide who will be the African champions.

The 2019–20 Rugby Africa Cup was the first tournament after the restructuring, but was cancelled in 2020 due to the COVID-19 pandemic. The 2021–22 Rugby Africa Cup will double as a 2023 Rugby World Cup qualifier for Africa.

In addition to the main fifteens tournaments, an Under-20 competition featuring eight teams was held in April and a rugby sevens tournament involving twelve teams was held in November. A women's rugby sevens tournament is also to be scheduled.

Summary
Below is a list of previous tournaments and final results:

Overall
The overall record of the teams are as follows:

<div id="*">* hosts
<div id="*">** home/away

Rugby Africa Gold Cup perpetual trophy

The Rugby Africa Gold Cup is the perpetual trophy awarded to the winner of the Africa Cup (Africa Gold Cup), an annual rugby union tournament involving Africa's top six national 15-man teams (excluding South Africa), organised by World Rugby's African association, Rugby Africa, since 2000.

It has been presented to the winner of the Rugby Africa Gold Cup for the first time in August 2018.

Prior to this date, each winner of the Rugby Africa Gold Cup received a trophy.

The back of the trophy is engraved with the text "Presented by Nicolas Pompigne-Mognard, Founder of APO Group; Abdelaziz Bougja, President of Rugby Africa".

Handmade by Swatkins, Great Britain's leading Trophy, Award and Silverware manufacturer since 1898, the Rugby Africa Gold Cup is a Gold Plated Perpetual Trophy Cup. The Trophy has been engraved with the text 'Rugby Africa Gold Cup' and has the shape of Africa in pride of place on the main body. To complete, on the gold plated plinth band this holds the names of the winners. It's estimated there is enough space for at least 70 winning teams' names to be engraved on the base of the perpetual trophy, which would allow it to be used until at least the year 2080.

Lower Level Championships

Second level

Third level

Fourth level

See also

Rugby Africa Sevens
African Development Trophy
Victoria Cup
North African Tri Nations

References

External links
 Official site

 
2000 establishments in Africa
Rugby union competitions in Africa for national teams
Recurring sporting events established in 2000